"Blink" is a song recorded by Spanish singer Bad Gyal featuring Colombian-British producer Florentino. It was released by Puro Records and Canada Editorial on 2 February 2018 as the first single from Bad Gyal's second mixtape Worldwide Angel. It was written by Bad Gyal and Florentino, and produced by the latter one.

Background and release
Bad Gyal and Florentino met at the 24th Sónar musical festival held in Barcelona in 2017; there she proposed the collaboration to him. In correspondence with The Fader, Bad Gyal said, "We hit it off creatively and made the most of his stay in Barcelona. We recorded 'Blink' among other tracks that you will all be able to listen to soon."

"Blink" was released for digital download and streaming on 2 February 2018.

Composition
"Blink" was written by Bad Gyal and Florentino. It was composed in the key of A major, with a tempo of 94 beats per minute.

In a review for Pitchfork, Meaghan Garvey wrote that on the song, "slow-winding dancehall rhythms with pulsing bass and staccato hand-claps climax in thumping reggaeton with hypnotic synth washes. Bad Gyal's voice stutters and chops along with the dembow drum loops."

Music video
The accompanying music video for "Blink" was released on 8 February 2018, 00:00 CET, five days after the song release. The video was produced by Canada, and directed by Alexis Gómez. It was filmed at the Mercado Jamaica and the Foro Normandie in Mexico City, during Bad Gyal's first tour in the country in October 2017.

Credits and personnel
 Bad Gyal – vocals, songwriting
 Florentino – featured artist, production
 El Guincho – mixing
 Vlado Meller – mastering

Release history

References

2018 singles
2018 songs
Bad Gyal songs
Music videos shot in Mexico
Song recordings produced by el Guincho
Songs about dancing
Spanish-language songs